Useuta is a river in Bolivia, and is a tribute of the Mamoré-Madeira river system.

References 

Rivers of Bolivia